Abacetus anjouaniananus is a species of ground beetle in the subfamily Pterostichinae. It was described by Straneo in 1973 and is an endemic species found in Madagascar, Africa.

References

anjouaniananus
Beetles described in 1973
Insects of Southern Africa